Gongkwon Yusul is a modern Korean martial art system founded by Kang Jun in 1996. Its main influences include the martial arts of Hapkido, Hakko-ryu Jujutsu, Judo and Kyuk Too Ki (Korean style Thai Boxing/Shoot Boxing). Gongkwon Yusul is a system which emphasises the application of striking, locking, and throwing techniques in practical, free-flowing fighting situations, rather than the static applications more common in traditional styles of Hapkido.

It also varies from Hapkido in that many of its hand techniques are strongly influenced by Western boxing, and that a significant part of Gongkwon Yusul training is in groundwork, applying techniques more akin to judo and Brazilian jiu-jitsu than most Hapkido styles.

In a sense Gongkwon Yusul is an attempt to combine the practical, free-flowing techniques often seen in mixed martial arts, whilst still retaining many traditional martial art attributes, such as uniforms, terminology, and ranking structure.

Since its foundation the art has grown rapidly in its home country of Korea with many dojangs around Seoul and also some regional areas of South Korea. This martial art is not widely known outside of Korea, however there have been dojangs opened in other countries. The first was established in Brazil in 2006, the second in Melbourne in 2007, the third in Launceston, Australia in 2008, the fourth in Gold Coast, Australia in 2008, the fifth in Spain in 2009, the sixth in Brisbane, Australia in 2009, and the seventh in Austin, Texas in 2011, where country music singer/songwriter Willie Nelson earned his fifth degree black belt on April 28, 2014.

Ranks

GongKwon Yusul belt ranks are:

 White                   
 Yellow (5th gup)   
 Green (4th gup)    
 Blue (3rd gup)   
 Red (2nd  gup) 
 Brown (1st gup) 
 Black

References

Footnotes

Citations 

•http://www.tangsoodo.co.kr / 우리 武藝唐手道敎本

•http://www.kkhf.net / 指導資敎本

•http://www.hosinsool.net / 國際護身術敎本

External links 
 www.gongkwon.com (Korean)
 www.gongkwonyusul.com.au (English) 
 www.gongkwonspain.com (Spanish)
 www.swedengk.com (Swedish)
 www.gongkwonyusulusa.com (English)

South Korean martial arts